Sixth All-Ukrainian Congress of Soviets was a congress of  Soviets (councils) of workers, peasants, Red-army-men deputies that took place in Kharkiv on December 14 - 17, 1921.

Composition
There were 1,037 delegates out which 820 had a ruling vote.

Agenda
 Report of the Ukrainian Sovnarkom
 About food tax (Prodnalog)
 Famine and sowing campaign
 Red Army and its tasks
 Committees of Poor Peasants
 Financial policy
 Elections to the All-Ukrainian Central Executive Committee and delegates for the Ninth Russian Congress of Soviets

Decisions
The congress adopted a resolution "About the grain fund for committees of poor peasants". Specific measures to provide assistance for the peasants on the part of the state were outlined in a resolution "About holding a spring sowing campaign in 1922".

In resolution on military issue, were marked numerous events in further strengthening a combat capability of Red Army and Red Fleet.

The congress elected 198 members and 62 candidates to the All-Ukrainian Central Executive Committee as well as 254 delegates for the Ninth Russian Congress of Soviets and 51 candidate to the All-Russian Central Executive Committee from the Ukrainian SSR. The honorary member of the All-Ukrainian Central Executive Committee at the congress was elected Vladimir Lenin. The congress decisions had great significance in creating conditions for successful realization of the Lenin's New Economic Policy.

External links
Sixth All-Ukrainian Congress of Soviets at Ukrainian Soviet Encyclopedia

Russian Revolution in Ukraine
6
Political history of Ukraine
1921 in Ukraine
History of Kharkiv
1921 in politics
Communism in Ukraine
1921 conferences